Ada Bakker (born 8 April 1948) is a former Dutch female tennis player who was active during the 1960s and 1970s. During her career Bakker played in three of the four Grand Slam tournaments, namely the Australian Open, Wimbledon and the US Open. Her most successful Grand Slam was Wimbledon where she reached the third round of the singles event in 1968, 1970, and 1971. Her best doubles result was reaching the quarterfinal of the 1968 Australian Open.

She competed in the 1967 Summer Universiade in Tokyo and won the women's doubles gold medal with Astrid Suurbeek. She also reached the final of the singles event which she lost to Nell Truman.

In 1969 and 1974 Bakker was a member of the Dutch Federation Cup team which reached the semifinals on both occasions. In total she played seven Federation Cup matches, all of them in doubles, of which she won five.

Career finals

Doubles (2 runner-ups)

References

External links 
 
 

1948 births
Living people
Dutch female tennis players
Universiade medalists in tennis
Place of birth missing (living people)
Universiade gold medalists for the Netherlands
Universiade silver medalists for the Netherlands
Medalists at the 1967 Summer Universiade
Medalists at the 1970 Summer Universiade
20th-century Dutch women
20th-century Dutch people
21st-century Dutch women